A Warm December is a 1973 American romantic drama film directed by Sidney Poitier and starring him in the lead role as Dr. Matt Younger. It also stars Jamaican actress Esther Anderson as Catherine, Matt's love interest. Anderson's performance as an African princess won her a NAACP Image Award for Best Actress in 1973. The film is also notable for an appearance of Letta Mbulu singing, with an African choir,  "Nonqonqo" by Miriam Makeba. Coleridge-Taylor Perkinson wrote and conducted the score.

The story was influenced by Roman Holiday and Love Story. It was shot at Pinewood Studios.

Plot
Dr. Matt Younger is a recently widowed American who takes his daughter Stefanie on a month-long vacation in London. While there, he meets Catherine, the niece of African Ambassador George Oswandu. Catherine is involved in negotiations with the Soviet Union to build a vital hydroelectric project in her country. As the pair begin to develop feelings for one another, Dr. Younger learns that the two men following Catherine are not the sinister characters he suspected. One is a bodyguard sent by her uncle, the other is a doctor monitoring the sickle cell disease that will end her life all too soon. She herself says that she is in the December of her life. When Dr. Younger proposes, Catherine must decide between not only love and loyalty to her country, but also seizing the time that remains to her and saddling the man she loves with her inevitable death. In the end, she refuses, thanking him for a "warm December".

Cast
 Sidney Poitier as Dr. Matt Younger
 Esther Anderson as Catherine Oswandu
 Yvette Curtis as Stefanie Younger
 George Baker as Dr. Henry Barlow
 Johnny Sekka as Dr. Joseph Myomo
 Earl Cameron as Ambassador George Oswandu
 Hilary Crane as Marsha Barlow

References

External links
 
 
 
 

1973 films
1973 romantic drama films
American romantic drama films
1970s English-language films
Films directed by Sidney Poitier
Films set in London
Films shot at Pinewood Studios
First Artists films
1970s American films